Silene verecunda is a species of flowering plant in the family Caryophyllaceae known by the common name San Francisco campion.

It is native to western North America, particularly California and Baja California, as well as Nevada and Utah. It grows in a number of habitat types, from coastline to high alpine mountain slopes, and including chaparral, woodlands, and meadows.

Description
Silene verecunda is an extremely variable plant. In general, it is a perennial herb growing 10 centimeters to over half a meter tall, usually with several erect stems. It is hairy, and usually glandular and sticky in texture. The lance-shaped leaves are variable in size, the largest ones usually growing at the caudex.

Each flower is encapsulated in a tubular calyx of fused sepals which is lined with ten veins. The petals are white or pink and have two lobes in their tips and two appendages at their bases.

References

External links
Jepson Manual Treatment of Silene verecunda
CalFlora Database:  Silene verecunda (Dolores Campion,  San Francisco campion)
USDA Plants Profile for Silene verecunda
Flora of North America
UC Photos gallery: Silene verecunda

verecunda
Flora of Baja California
Flora of California
Flora of Nevada
Flora of Utah
Flora of the Great Basin
Flora of the Sierra Nevada (United States)
Natural history of the California chaparral and woodlands
Natural history of the California Coast Ranges
Natural history of the Mojave Desert
Natural history of the Peninsular Ranges
Natural history of the San Francisco Bay Area
Natural history of the Santa Monica Mountains
Natural history of the Transverse Ranges
Flora without expected TNC conservation status